Tupac Amaru District is one of eight districts in the Canas Province in Peru. Its seat is the village of Tungasuca.

Geography 
Other mountains are listed below:

Ethnic groups 
The people in the district are mainly indigenous citizens of Quechua descent. Quechua is the language which the majority of the population (97.85%) learnt to speak in childhood, 1.72% of the residents started speaking using the Spanish language (2007 Peru Census).

Sources